18 Meals is a 2010 Spanish comedy film directed by Jorge Coira and starring Luis Tosar and Federico Pérez Rey.

Cast 
 Luis Tosar as Edu
  as Tuto 
  as Fran
  as Sol
 Gael Nodar Fernández as Gael
 Pedro Alonso as Vladimir Torres
  as Teo

References

External links 

2010 comedy films
2010 films
Spanish comedy films
Galician-language films
2010s Spanish-language films
2010s Spanish films